"I Love You So" is a song by American indie-pop band the Walters. It was released on November 28, 2014 from the band's debut EP Songs for Dads. In 2021, it went viral on video sharing app TikTok, where it has over half a million views, and gained over 350 million streams on Spotify. The song was included in the band's first EP after their 2021 reunion, Try Again, released in May 2022.

Background
In 2017, the band performed in Lollapalooza, hereafter they announced the band temporarily disbanded. In mid-2021, the song started to become popular on TikTok, at that time the band's members reconnected together, and signed with Warner Records. In a press release, the band said: "'I Love You So'. This song kicked off our career and now it's the song that got the band back together". About the internet meme on TikTok, the band told magazine Variety: "It was a sign from the universe, There's a reason why this song keeps coming back into our lives, and the TikTok virality was definitely the extra kick we needed to be like, 'Okay, let's give this another shot and let's try to make the most of it.'".

Content
Warner Records CEO Aaron Bay-Schuck stated in an interview with Billboard: "I Love You So" is "a perfect and modern example of a great song, [...] The song is memorable upon first listen and timeless in its production so no surprise it has risen above the clutter to identify itself as a hit song".

Remix
In January 2022, the band released a new remix version with King Henry.

Credits and personnel
Credits adapted from Tidal.
The Walters
 Charlie Ekhaus – drums, mastering, mixing, producer
 Walter Kosner – guitar, producer
 Luke Olson – lead vocals, producer
 MJ Tirabassi – backing vocals, producer
 Danny Wells – bass, producer

Additional musicians
 Aaron Aptaker – keyboards

Charts

Weekly charts

Year-end charts

Certifications

Release history

References

2014 songs
2014 singles
Warner Records singles
The Walters songs